Charles Aznavour (1924-2018) is a French and Armenian singer, songwriter, actor, public activist and diplomat

It may also refer to:

Places
Charles Aznavour Square, Yerevan, Armenia
Charles Aznavour Square, Gyumri, Armenia
Charles Aznavour Museum, museum in Yerevan, Armenia

Music
Charles Aznavour (Il faut savoir), 1961 album
Charles Aznavour (Je m'voyais déjà), 1961 album

See also
Aznavour